Iride Semprini de Bellis (São Paulo, May 10, 1931) is a Brazilian actress and comedian.

Career 
She became known between 2013 and 2015 for participating in the boards of the program Pânico na Band as "Vovó Vida Loka",

Filmography 

 Pânico na Band (2013)
 A Dona do Pedaço (2019)

References 

1931 births
Living people
Brazilian actors
Brazilian women comedians